Russell Wood (born May 4, 1994) is a Canadian backstroke distance swimmer.

References

External links
 Biography at swimming.ca

Living people
1994 births
Canadian male freestyle swimmers
Swimmers from Calgary
Swimmers at the 2014 Commonwealth Games
Swimmers at the 2015 Pan American Games
Pan American Games bronze medalists for Canada
Pan American Games medalists in swimming
Medalists at the 2015 Pan American Games
Commonwealth Games competitors for Canada